William Louis Wallace (born December 1, 1945) is an American martial artist, karateka, actor and former professional kickboxer. He is known for his adept use of high-speed leg kicks, earning him the nickname "Superfoot." He was the Professional Karate Association (PKA) World Full-Contact Champion, and the Middleweight Kickboxing Champion for six years, retiring with a 23-0-0 record. Bill Wallace is the International Ambassador for PKA Worldwide.

Background 
Wallace was born in Portland, Indiana, and trained in wrestling during his high school years. He began his study of Judo in 1966 and was forced to discontinue his Judo related activities because of an injury he suffered to his right knee during practice. He then began to study Shōrin-ryū Karate under Michael Gneck in February 1967 while serving in the U.S. Air Force. After entering the point fighting tournament scene and achieving success there, he switched to full-contact competition.

With the coaching help of veteran fighter Jim 'Ronin' Harrison, Wallace won 23 consecutive professional fights between 1974 and 1980, becoming the Professional Karate Association middleweight world full-contact karate champion and retiring undefeated. He was known for his fast left leg kicks, especially his roundhouse kick and his hook kick, which was clocked at about 60 mph. He focused on his left leg because of the Judo-related injury to his right knee, using the right leg primarily as a base. He also was kicked to the groin during a point fighting tournament and suffered the loss of one testicle.

A year later, Wallace turned professional and captured the PKA middleweight karate championship with a second-round knockout. He relinquished the crown in 1980, undefeated. The PKA promoted the sport of full-contact karate. Full-contact karate differed from kickboxing in that leg kicks were allowed in kickboxing and forbidden in full-contact karate.  It was PKA President, Don Quine, who coined the phrase "Superfoot" to describe Wallace after witnessing his fight first with Mark Georgantas and then with Jem Echollas.

In 1990 Bill Wallace (166 lbs) fought one last exhibition kickboxing/karate match with friend Joe Lewis (198 lbs) on pay per view. Both Wallace and Lewis were refused a boxing license because of their age. The exhibition ended with one judge in favor of Wallace and the other two judges scored the bout a tie; ending the exhibition in a draw.

Education 

Wallace studied at Ball State University, earning a bachelor's degree in 1971 in physical education. In 1976, he earned a master's degree in kinesiology from Memphis State University.

Accomplishments 

Wallace has taught karate, judo, wrestling, and weightlifting at Memphis State University. The author of a college textbook about karate and kinesiology, he continues to teach seminars across the United States and abroad. He has acted, most notably in A Force of One starring Chuck Norris. Wallace was the play-by-play commentator for the inaugural Ultimate Fighting Championship pay-per-view event UFC 1 in 1993 alongside fellow kickboxer Kathy Long and NFL Hall of Fame player Jim Brown in which he burped as he said, "Hello, I'm Bill Wallace, and welcome to McNichols Arena" in what has become a much beloved blooper from that event. Wallace administers an organization of karate schools under his "Superfoot" system. He was elected to Black Belt Magazine's Hall of Fame in 1973 as "Tournament Karate Fighter of the Year" and again in 1978 as "Man of the Year." His film credits include A Force of One with Chuck Norris; Killpoint, with Cameron Mitchell; Continental Divide and Neighbors, with John Belushi; The Protector, with Jackie Chan; Los Bravos with Hector Echavarria; A Prayer for the Dying, with Mickey Rourke; Ninja Turf; and Sword of Heaven.

Miscellaneous  

Bill Wallace was a personal trainer and close friend of both Elvis Presley and John Belushi. On March 5, 1982, Bill Wallace found John Belushi dead of a cocaine and heroin overdose, in his room in Bungalow 3, at the Chateau Marmont, on Sunset Boulevard, in Hollywood, California.

Wallace has written and co-written a number of books, including:
 The Best of Bill Wallace
 Competitive Karate: Featuring the Superfoot System
 The Ultimate Kick 
 Dynamic Kicking & Stretching 
 Karate: Basic Concepts & Skills 

DVD format:
 BOOST Karate for Children
 Karate: Basic Concepts & Skills 

Bill Wallace also starred in the 1985 James Glickenhaus action film "The Protector" alongside Jackie Chan and Danny Aiello.  Wallace played a tough ex karate champ bodyguard (for a criminal boss), who has an extended fight scene with cop Jackie Chan in a Hong Kong warehouse.

Kickboxing record

|-
|
|Win
| Robert Biggs
| 
|Anderson, Indiana, USA
|Decision
| style="text-align:center;"|12
| style="text-align:center;"|2:00
|20–0
|Defends PKA Middleweight World title.
|-
|
|Win
| Tom Georgiades
| 
|Denver, Colorado, USA
|KO
| style="text-align:center;"|2
| style="text-align:center;"|
|19–0
| 
|-
|
|Win
| Raymond McCallum
| 
|Oklahoma City, Oklahoma, USA
|Decision
| style="text-align:center;"|5
| style="text-align:center;"|2:00
|18–0
| 
|-
|
|Win
| Steve Mackey
| 
|West Palm Beach, Florida, USA
|Decision
| style="text-align:center;"|5
| style="text-align:center;"|2:00
|17–0
| 
|-
|
|Win
| Daryl Tyler
| 
|Monte Carlo, Monaco
|TKO
| style="text-align:center;"|6
| style="text-align:center;"|
|16–0
|Defends PKA Middleweight World title.
|-
|
|Win
| Ralph Hollett
| 
|Halifax, Nova Scotia, Canada
|Decision
| style="text-align:center;"|7
| style="text-align:center;"|2:00
|15–0
| 
|-
|
|Win
| Glen Mehlmen
| 
|Miami, Florida, USA
|Decision
| style="text-align:center;"|7
| style="text-align:center;"|2:00
|14–0
| 
|-
|
|Win
| Emilio Narvaez
| 
|Providence, Rhode Island, USA
|Decision
| style="text-align:center;"|9
| style="text-align:center;"|2:00
|13–0
|Defends PKA Middleweight World title.
|-
|
|Win
| Burnis White
| 
|Honolulu, Hawaii, USA
|Decision
| style="text-align:center;"|9
| style="text-align:center;"|2:00
|12–0
|Defends PKA Middleweight World title.
|-
|
|Win
| Pat Worley
| 
|Indianapolis, Indiana, USA
|KO
| style="text-align:center;"|2
| style="text-align:center;"|
|11–0
|Defends PKA Middleweight World title.
|-
|
|Win
| Herbie Thompson
| 
|Miami, Florida, USA
|TKO
| style="text-align:center;"|2
| style="text-align:center;"|
|10–0
| 
|-
|
|Win
| Ron Thivierge
| 
|Providence, Rhode Island, USA
|TKO
| style="text-align:center;"|6
| style="text-align:center;"|
|9–0
|Defends PKA Middleweight World title.
|-
|
|Win
| Blinky Rodriguez
| 
|Las Vegas, Nevada, USA
|Decision
| style="text-align:center;"|9
| style="text-align:center;"|2:00
|8–0
|Defends PKA Middleweight World title.
|-
|
|Win
| Gary Edens
| 
|Los Angeles, California, USA
|Decision
| style="text-align:center;"|9
| style="text-align:center;"|2:00
|7–0
|Defends PKA Middleweight World title.
|-
|
|Win
| Daniel Richer
| 
|Toronto, Ontario, Canada
|TKO
| style="text-align:center;"|3
| style="text-align:center;"|
|6–0
|Defends PKA Middleweight World title.
|-
|
|Win
| Dieter Herdel
| 
|Paris, France
|KO (hook kick)
| style="text-align:center;"|1
| style="text-align:center;"|0:44
|5–0
| 
|-
|
|Win
| Jem Echollas
| 
|Las Vegas, Nevada, USA
|KO
| style="text-align:center;"|2
| style="text-align:center;"|
|4–0
|Defends PKA Middleweight World title.
|-
|
|Win
| Joe Corley
| 
|Atlanta, Georgia, USA
|TKO
| style="text-align:center;"|9
| style="text-align:center;"|1:31
|3–0
|Defends PKA Middleweight World title.
|-
|
|Win
| Daniel Richer
| 
|Los Angeles, California, USA
|Decision
| style="text-align:center;"|3
| style="text-align:center;"|2:00
|2–0
|Wins PKA Middleweight  World title.
|-
|
|Win
| Bernd Grothe
| 
|Los Angeles, California, USA
|TKO
| style="text-align:center;"|3
| style="text-align:center;"|
|1–0
| 
|-
| colspan=10 | Legend:

Filmography

References

External links 
Bill Wallace's web site

Living people
1945 births
Mixed martial arts broadcasters
Ball State University alumni
University of Memphis alumni
American male karateka
American male kickboxers
Middleweight kickboxers
Kickboxers from Indiana
People from Portland, Indiana
Shōrin-ryū practitioners
United States Air Force airmen